The Baojun RM-5 is a five-door seven-seater MPV produced by SAIC-GM-Wuling through the Baojun brand. It was introduced in September 2019.

Overview

The RM-5 debuted as a concept car named RM-C during the 2019 Shanghai Auto Show at the Shanghai International Fashion Center in April 2019. 

The mass production version was announced three months later. The RM-5 is positioned under the 'New Baojun' sub-category together with the RS-5 and RC-6, and as the upmarket alternative to the Baojun 730. Initial prices started from 86,800 yuan to 118,800 yuan. Transmission options include a standard six-speed manual transmission and an optional CVT that can simulate eight speeds.

References 

RM-5
Cars introduced in 2019
SAIC-GM-Wuling
Cars of China
Front-wheel-drive vehicles
Vehicles with CVT transmission